Vauquelinite is a complex mineral with the formula CuPb2(CrO4)(PO4)(OH) making it a combined chromate and phosphate of copper and lead. It forms a series with the arsenate mineral fornacite. 

It was first described in 1818 in the Beryozovskoye deposit, Urals, Russia, and named for Louis Vauquelin (1763–1829), a French chemist. It occurs in oxidized hydrothermal ore deposits and is associated with crocoite, pyromorphite, mimetite, cerussite, beudantite and duftite at the type locality in Russia.

References

Copper(II) minerals
Lead minerals
Chromate minerals
Phosphate minerals
Monoclinic minerals
Minerals in space group 14